Wallace Edgar Pierce (December 9, 1881 – January 3, 1940) was a Republican member of the United States House of Representatives from New York.

Biography
Pierce was born in Black Brook, New York. He graduated from Plattsburgh Normal School in 1903. He served as a secretary to Congressman George R. Malby from 1909 until 1912 and Congressman Edwin A. Merritt from 1912 until 1914.

Pierce was a member of the New York State Assembly (Clinton Co.) in 1917, 1918 and 1919. He was chairman of the Clinton County Republican committee from 1926 until 1940. He was elected to Congress in 1938 and served from January 3, 1939, until his death in Washington, D.C. on January 3, 1940. Pierce was interred in Riverside Cemetery, Plattsburgh, N.Y.

See also
 List of United States Congress members who died in office (1900–49)

References

U.S. Government Printing Office, "Wallace Edgar Pierce, Late a Representative from New York". 1941

1881 births
1940 deaths
State University of New York at Plattsburgh alumni
People from Clinton County, New York
Republican Party members of the New York State Assembly
Republican Party members of the United States House of Representatives from New York (state)
20th-century American politicians